Cremnomys is a genus of rodent in the family Muridae native to India. It contains the following species:

 Cutch rat (Cremnomys cutchicus) 
 Elvira rat (Cremnomys elvira)

References

 
Rodent genera
Taxa named by Robert Charles Wroughton
Taxonomy articles created by Polbot